Loria is a comune (municipality) in the Province of Treviso in the Italian region Veneto, located about  northwest of Venice and about  west of Treviso.

The municipality of Loria contains the frazioni (subdivisions, mainly villages and hamlets) Bessica, Castione, and Ramon.

Loria borders the following municipalities: Cassola, Castello di Godego, Galliera Veneta, Mussolente, Riese Pio X, Rossano Veneto, San Martino di Lupari, San Zenone degli Ezzelini.

Demographic evolution

References

External links
 www.comuneloria.it/

Cities and towns in Veneto